Honour Gombami (born 9 January 1983) is a Zimbabwean former professional football player. He is a member of the Zimbabwe national football team.

Cercle's new head coach De Boeck was quite immediately impressed by Gombami's skills. He even stated that in the future he saw Gombami playing for Anderlecht, De Boeck's former team and Belgium's most notable top team. Rumours were going that Anderlecht had approached Gombami for a transfer in May 2008. However, Anderlecht manager Herman Van Holsbeeck denied this.

Gombami lives together with his teammate Vuza Nyoni in an apartment in Bruges. They both recommended Obadiah Tarumbwa to the Cercle management.

In December 2010, Gombami was severely injured in a match against RC Genk. It took 15 months for Gombami to make his comeback. In the summer of 2012, Gombami signed for Belgian Second Division team Antwerp. He then played three years for Izegem, and retired in 2016.

References

External links
 
 

1983 births
Living people
People from Gwanda
Zimbabwean footballers
Zimbabwe international footballers
Zimbabwean expatriate footballers
Cercle Brugge K.S.V. players
Royal Antwerp F.C. players
Association football forwards
Belgian Pro League players
Challenger Pro League players
Expatriate footballers in Belgium
Zimbabwean expatriate sportspeople in Belgium
Sportspeople from Matabeleland South Province
Highlanders F.C. players
Royal FC Mandel United players